Kai Chresten Winding (May 18, 1922 – May 6, 1983) was a Danish-born American trombonist and jazz composer. He is known for his collaborations with fellow trombonist J. J. Johnson. His version of "More", the theme from the movie Mondo Cane, reached in 1963 number 8 in the Billboard Hot 100 and remained his only entry here.

Biography
Winding was born in Aarhus, Denmark. His father, Ove Winding was a naturalized U.S. citizen, thus Kai, his mother and sisters, though born abroad were already U.S. citizens. In September 1934, his mother, Jenny Winding, moved Kai and his two sisters, Ann and Alice. Kai graduated in 1940 from Stuyvesant High School in New York City and that same year began his career as a professional trombonist with Shorty Allen's band. Subsequently, he played with Sonny Dunham and Alvino Rey, until he entered the United States Coast Guard during World War II.

After the war, Winding was a member of Benny Goodman's orchestra, then Stan Kenton's. He participated in Birth of the Cool sessions in 1949, appearing on four of the twelve tracks, while J. J. Johnson appeared on the other eight, having participated on the other two sessions. 

In 1954, at the urging of producer Ozzie Cadena, Winding began a long association with Johnson, recording trombone duets for Savoy Records, then Columbia. He experimented with instruments in brass ensembles. The album Jay & Kai + 6 (1956) featured a trombone octet and the trombonium. He composed and arranged many of the works he and Johnson recorded.

During the 1960s, Winding began an association with Verve Records and producer Creed Taylor. He released the first version of "Time Is On My Side" in 1963 before it was recorded by Irma Thomas and The Rolling Stones. His best selling recording from this period is "More," the theme from the movie Mondo Cane, which reached number 8 in the Billboard Hot 100 and remained his only entry here. Arranged and conducted by Claus Ogerman, "More" featured what is probably the first appearance of the French electronic music instrument the ondioline on an American recording. Although Winding was credited with playing the ondioline, guitarist Vinnie Bell, who worked on the session, claimed that it was played by Jean-Jacques Perrey, a pioneer of electronic music. Winding experimented with ensembles again, recorded solo albums, and one album of country music with the Anita Kerr Singers. He followed Creed Taylor to A&M/CTI and made more albums with J. J. Johnson. He was a member of the all-star jazz group Giants of Jazz in 1971.

His son, Jai Winding, is a keyboardist who has worked as a session musician, writer and producer in Los Angeles.

Kai Winding died of a brain tumor in New York City in 1983.

Discography

As leader/co-leader
 Loaded (1945)
 Kai Winding All Stars (Roost, 1949–51 [1952])
 Arrangements by Gerry Mulligan (1951)
 Brass Fever (1956)
 Trombone Panorama (Columbia, 1956)
 The Trombone Sound (Columbia, 1956)
 The Axidentals with the Kai Winding Trombones (ABC-Paramount, 1958)
 The Swingin' States (Columbia, 1958)
 Dance to the City Beat (Columbia, 1959)
 The Incredible Kai Winding Trombones (Impulse!, 1960)
 Kai Olé (Verve, 1961)
 Brand New Swinging Together Again (1961)
 Suspense Themes in Jazz (Verve, 1962)
 The Great Kai Winding Sound (1962)
 Soul Surfin' (Verve, 1963) featuring Kenny Burrell – also released as !!!More!!!
 Solo (Verve, 1963)
 Kai Winding (Verve, 1963)
 That's Where It Is (SESAC, 1963)
 Mondo Cane No. 2 (Verve, 1964)
 Modern Country (Verve, 1965)
 Rainy Day (Verve, 1965)
 The In Instrumentals (Verve, 1965)
 Dirty Dog (Verve, 1966)
 More Brass (Verve, 1966)
 Penny Lane & Time (Verve, 1967)
 Danish Blue (1974)
 Caravan (Glendale, 1977)
 Jazz Showcase (1977)
 Lionel Hampton Presents Kai Winding (1977)
 Duo Bones (Red, 1979) with Dino Piana
 Giant Bones '80 (Sonet, 1980) with Curtis Fuller
 Bone Appétit (Black & Blue, 1980) with Curtis Fuller
 Trombone Summit (MPS, 1981) with Albert Mangelsdorff, Bill Watrous, Jiggs Whigham
 In Cleveland 1957 (1994)

With J. J. Johnson
 The Four Trombones: The Debut Recordings (1953)
 An Afternoon at Birdland (RCA, 1954)
 Dec. 3, 1954 (Prestige, 1954)
 Jay & Kai (Savoy, 1952–54 [1955]) 
 K + J.J. (Bethlehem, 1955)
 Trombone for Two (Columbia, 1955)
 Trombone by Three (Prestige, 1949 [1956])
 Jay and Kai + 6 (Columbia, 1956)
 Dave Brubeck and Jay & Kai at Newport (Columbia, 1956)
 Jay and Kai (Columbia, 1956)
 The Great Kai & J. J. (Impulse!, 1960)
 Israel (A&M/CTI, 1968)
 Betwixt & Between (A&M/CTI, 1968)
 Stonebone (A&M/CTI [Japan], 1969)

As sideman
With Ralph Burns and Leonard Feather
Winter Sequence (MGM, 1954)

With Quincy Jones
 1963 Quincy Jones Plays Hip Hits (Mercury, 1963)
 1965 Quincy Plays for Pussycats (Mercury, 1959-65 [1965])
 1969 Walking in Space
 1976 I Heard That!

With Stan Kenton
 Stan Kenton's Milestones (Capitol, 1943–47 [1950])
 Stan Kenton Classics (Capitol, 1944–47 [1952])
 Artistry in Rhythm (Capitol, 1946)
 Encores (Capitol, 1947)
 The Kenton Era (Capitol, 1940–54, [1955])

With King Pleasure
 1954 King Pleasure Sings/Annie Ross Sings
 1954 The Original Moody's Mood
 1955 King Pleasure

With Pete Rugolo
 Rugolomania (Columbia, 1955)
 New Sounds by Pete Rugolo (Harmony, 1954–55, [1957])

With Zoot Sims
 1949 The Brothers 
 1952 Zoot Sims All Stars
 1962 Good Old Zoot

With Sarah Vaughan
 1955 In the Land of Hi-Fi
 1957 The George Gershwin Songbook, Vol. 1
 1958 The Rodgers & Hart Songbook
 1965 Viva! Vaughan

With others
 1950 Carnegie Hall X-Mas '49, Charlie Parker
 1950 Chubby Jackson All Star Big Band, Chubby Jackson
 1951 The George Wallington Trio, George Wallington
 1954 Oscar Pettiford Sextet, Oscar Pettiford
 1955 This Is Chris, Chris Connor
 1955 Jumping with Ventura, Charlie Ventura
 1956 Drummer Man, Gene Krupa
 1957 Chris, Chris Connor
 1957 Birth of the Cool, Miles Davis
 1957 The Beat of My Heart, Tony Bennett
 1959 Plays Gerry Mulligan Arrangements, Gene Krupa
 1962 I Wanna Be Loved, Dinah Washington
 1962 Rhythm Is My Business, Ella Fitzgerald
 1962 Cabin in the Sky, Curtis Fuller 
 1963 Any Number Can Win, Jimmy Smith
 1963 Broadway, Gerry Mulligan
 1964 New Fantasy, Lalo Schifrin
 1965 Jazz Dialogue , Modern Jazz Quartet
 1965 The Shadow of Your Smile, Astrud Gilberto
 1967 Prezervation, Stan Getz
 1968 Summertime,  Paul Desmond
 1969 Chubby Jackson Sextet and Big Band, Chubby Jackson
 1971 The Giants of Jazz with Art Blakey, Dizzy Gillespie, Thelonious Monk
 1972 Strictly Bebop, Dizzy Gillespie
 1973 The Art of the Modern Jazz Quartet, Modern Jazz Quartet
 1975 Chase the Clouds Away, Chuck Mangione
 1977 Featured with the Tadd Dameron Band, Fats Navarro
 1978 Children of Sanchez, Chuck Mangione
 1979 Giant Bones, Curtis Fuller
 1979 The New Mel Lewis Quintet Live, Mel Lewis

Notes

References

External links

The Incredible Kai Winding at Trombone Page of the World

Kai Winding: More (Theme From Mondo Cane), Video, Provided to YouTube by Universal Music Group

1922 births
1983 deaths
People from Aarhus
Danish emigrants to the United States
Stuyvesant High School alumni
United States Coast Guard personnel of World War II
American jazz composers
American male jazz composers
American jazz trombonists
Male trombonists
Columbia Records artists
Savoy Records artists
Jazz musicians from New York (state)
20th-century trombonists
20th-century American male musicians
Deaths from brain cancer in the United States
Deaths from cancer in New York (state)
The Giants of Jazz members
Bebop trombonists
20th-century jazz composers